The 2016 Peterborough City Council election took place on 5 May 2016 to elect all members of Peterborough City Council in Cambridgeshire. This was on the same day as other local elections.

Following a boundary review, all Peterborough City Council seats were up for election. The number of wards reduced from 24 to 22 but the number of seats increased from 57 to 60.

The Conservatives gained overall control of Peterborough City Council after taking 31 of the 60 seats.

Results Summary

Gain/loss column only indicates direct changes in seats that were contested at the last election and does not include seats picked up from newly created wards (new seat wins).

Ward Results

Barnack

Bretton

Central

Dogsthorpe

East

Eye, Thorney & Newborough

Fletton & Stanground

Fletton & Woodston

Glinton & Castor

Gunthorpe

Hampton Vale

Hargate & Hempsted

North

Orton Longueville

Orton Waterville

Park

Paston & Walton

Ravensthorpe

Stanground South

Werrington

West

Wittering

By-elections

East

A by-election was called due to the death of Cllr Marcus Sims.

Park

A by-election was called due to the resignation of Cllr John Shearman.

Eye, Thorney and Newborough

A by-election was called due to the resignation of Cllr David Sanders.

References

2016 English local elections
2016
2010s in Cambridgeshire